Steve Burke is a British video game composer, sound designer and voice actor. He is mostly known for his work at the British video game developer Rare.

Background and career
Burke was involved with music from early age. At home his family had a piano, which Burke played nearly every day. He also was playing the clarinet at Manx Youth Orchestra. At age of 20, Burke moved to London and studied at music branch of King's College London. Then, he graduated from Royal College of Music with a master's degree. At college, Burke often went to film recording sessions where he met such the masters of orchestra such as John Williams and Michael Kamen.

After college he was composing for films about a year before he was recruited by video game giant Rare in early 2001. He firstly provided additional music for Star Fox Adventures, but his first major and most successful work at the studio was the soundtrack for 2005 game Kameo: Elements of Power. The soundtrack was scored with Prague Philharmonic Orchestra. The game's music was well received and was nominated for several awards. He also scored Viva Piñata (with Grant Kirkhope), Jetpac Refuelled, Viva Piñata: Pocket Paradise (with David Wise) and Viva Piñata: Trouble in Paradise (again with Kirkhope). Aside from soundtracks, Burke also made sound effects for Perfect Dark Zero, Conker: Live and Reloaded and Banjo-Kazooie: Nuts and Bolts. He also had done additional voice acting for all games above.

In August 2009, Burke left Rare. In November 2010, Burke created all sound and music for Xbox Live Avatars. The work was done as a part of his former relationship with Rare, who were bought out by Microsoft in 2002. Most recently Burke co-composed music for ex-Rare developers Playtonic Games in Yooka-Laylee, along with David Wise and Grant Kirkhope.

Works

Voice acting

References

Rare (company) people
British composers
British male composers
British male voice actors
Video game composers
Manx people
Living people
Alumni of King's College London
Alumni of the Royal College of Music
Year of birth missing (living people)